The 2013 Elimination Chamber (known as No Escape in Germany) was the fourth Elimination Chamber professional wrestling pay-per-view (PPV) event produced by WWE. It took place on February 17, 2013, at the New Orleans Arena in New Orleans, Louisiana.

Eight matches, including one on the Pre-Show, were contested at the event. In the main event, The Rock retained the WWE Championship against CM Punk. In other prominent matches, Jack Swagger defeated Chris Jericho, Randy Orton, Daniel Bryan, Kane, and Mark Henry in an Elimination Chamber match to determine the number one contender for the World Heavyweight Championship at WrestleMania 29. Also on the show, Kaitlyn retained the WWE Divas Championship against Tamina Snuka, and The Shield (Dean Ambrose, Roman Reigns, and Seth Rollins) defeated John Cena, Ryback, and Sheamus.

The event received 213,000 pay-per-view buys, up from 178,000 buys the previous year's event received.

Production

Background
Elimination Chamber is a gimmick pay-per-view, produced every February by WWE since 2010. The concept of the show is that one or two main event matches are contested inside the Elimination Chamber, either with championships or future opportunities at championships at stake. The 2013 event was the fourth event under the Elimination Chamber chronology and was scheduled to be held on February 17, 2013, at the New Orleans Arena in New Orleans, Louisiana.

In 2011, the show was promoted as "No Escape" in Germany as it was feared that the name "Elimination Chamber" may remind people of the gas chambers used during the Holocaust. It was then promoted as "No Way Out" in 2012, but it returned to the "No Escape" title for 2013.

Storylines
The professional wrestling matches at Elimination Chamber featured professional wrestlers performing as characters in scripted events pre-determined by the hosting promotion, WWE. Storylines between the characters played out on WWE's primary television programs, Raw and SmackDown.

CM Punk began to feud with The Rock after Punk defeated Ryback in a Tables, Ladders, and Chairs match for the WWE Championship with the interference of The Shield. Rock defeated Punk for the title at the Royal Rumble, after The Rock requested a restart of the match when Mr. McMahon was about strip the title from Punk when the lights went out and Rock was laid out on the announce table. The following night, Punk invoked his rematch clause for the title, and on the February 11 episode of Raw, his manager Paul Heyman successfully negotiated whereby if Rock loses by countout or disqualification, Punk would be awarded the title.

Big Show would begin to feud with Alberto Del Rio after humiliating Del Rio's personal ring announcer, Ricardo Rodriguez, sarcastically picking him to fight Big Show for the World Heavyweight Championship during "Champion's Choice Night" on the New Year's Eve 2012 episode of Raw, leading to a disqualification win for Big Show after Del Rio interfered. On the January 11, 2013, episode of SmackDown, Del Rio defeated Big Show in a Last Man Standing match for the championship. Three days later on Raw, Big Show announced that he would invoke his rematch clause at the Royal Rumble. The week after, he made the match a Last Man Standing Match. Del Rio retained the title after Royal Rumble when Rodriguez duct taped Big Show's legs to the bottom rope, preventing him from standing up. After continuing attacks against each other, both agreed to another title match at Elimination Chamber.

After John Cena announced that he would face the WWE Champion at WrestleMania 29, SmackDown general manager Booker T made an Elimination Chamber match to determine the number one contender for the World Heavyweight Championship with only six entrants allowed to participate by winning qualifying matches issued by Booker T and Theodore Long. Randy Orton defeated Wade Barrett to qualify and Daniel Bryan defeated Rey Mysterio to qualify also. Kane and Jack Swagger defeated Dolph Ziggler and Zack Ryder respectively to earn qualification.  With Mark Henry and Chris Jericho making recent returns to the WWE, both demanded a spot in the Chamber. Both defeated men who had already qualified for the Elimination Chamber match; Henry defeated Orton and Jericho defeated Bryan.

Event

Pre-show
The Elimination Chamber Pre-Show saw Tensai and Brodus Clay defeat Team Rhodes Scholars (Cody Rhodes and Damien Sandow). Clay and Tensai won with a Double Splash, extending their unbeaten streak.

Preliminary matches
The first match that aired on the pay-per-view was the World Heavyweight Championship match, between The Big Show and the defending World Heavyweight Champion Alberto Del Rio. For the finish, Del Rio enzuigiri kicked Ricardo Rodriguez's bucket that Show was holding into his head which eventually led to his signature cross arm breaker for the submission victory.

The second match featured United States Champion Antonio Cesaro defending his title against The Miz, who came into the match with an injured shoulder via an attack by Cesaro on Raw. Cesaro eventually won by disqualification after he knocked The Miz's leg, causing him to fall knee-first into his groin therefore forcing the referee to call for a low blow. Afterwards, a frustrated Miz intentionally gave Cesaro a low blow.

The third match was the Elimination Chamber match, which involved Mark Henry, Daniel Bryan, Randy Orton, Kane, Chris Jericho, and Jack Swagger. Jericho and Bryan started the match, while the other four competitors were locked inside 'pods'. One pod at a time opened during the match at intervals of four minutes, releasing a wrestler into the match. Swagger was the first wrestler released, followed by Kane, Orton, and finally Henry. Before Henry entered the match, all of the five were down. Henry used the World's Strongest Slam to pin Bryan and eliminate him after approximately 16-and-a-half minutes. Kane was also eliminated by Henry in the same way. Swagger, Jericho and Orton teamed up to eliminate Henry, after a Big Boot by Swagger, Codebreaker by Jericho and an RKO by Orton to pin Henry after 23 minutes. After Henry was eliminated, he reentered the chamber and executed the World's Strongest Slam on the three. Jericho was the next man to be eliminated, after an RKO from Orton. Immediately after the pin, Swagger rolled Orton up to win and become the Number 1 contender for the World Heavyweight Championship at WrestleMania 29.

The following match was the 6-man tag team match between the hero team of John Cena, Sheamus and Ryback against The Shield (Dean Ambrose, Roman Reigns, and Seth Rollins). The face team took control of the early goings of the match with Cena, Ryback and Sheamus tagging each other and beating down Seth Rollins. The match became imbalanced when Reigns and Ambrose interfered. Reigns then speared Sheamus through the barricade. After what appeared to be a comeback from Cena's unit, Reigns also then speared Ryback as he was going for a Shell Shock on Rollins, who pinned him as Cena was preoccupied.

The fifth match of the evening was an unannounced match between Dolph Ziggler and Kofi Kingston. Ziggler was caught by Kingston's Trouble in Paradise but only managed a two count when Big E Langston pulled Ziggler to safety. After throwing Kingston into the ring post, Ziggler connected with a Zig Zag for the win. After the match, Langston, who headed up the entrance with Ziggler and AJ Lee, came back to the ring to attack Kingston, eventually laying him out with the Big Ending.

The sixth match was the WWE Divas Championship match between Tamina Snuka and the reigning champion Kaitlyn. Tamina went for the Superfly Splash but missed, receiving a spear from the champ for the winning pin.

Main event
In the main event, The Rock faced CM Punk for the WWE Championship. Near the end, Punk performed an Irish Whip on Rock, then Rock execute Rock Bottom on punk for a near-fall. which caused Rock to bump referee Mike Chioda, who was distracted by Paul Heyman, to the floor. Punk executed the GTS on Rock, and would get an 18 count on Rock but since the referee was knocked out, the pin was not counted. After The Rock countered a second GTS attempt with a People's Elbow on punk for a near-fall, Punk accidentally rolled on the replacement referee's ankle, making him unavailable for the rest of the match. Moments later, Rock ducked as Punk tried to hit him with his title belt, instead hitting Heyman. This allowed Rock to execute Second Rock Bottom on Punk to win the match. This meant that The Rock would head to WrestleMania 29 to defend his championship against Royal Rumble winner John Cena in a rematch from WrestleMania XXVIII.

Aftermath
The next night on Raw, The Rock revealed a new design for the WWE Championship title. Cena, as the winner of the Royal Rumble, became the number one contender for the title and was about to make his way down to the ring to confront Rock until he was attacked by CM Punk who felt he was still the number one contender. Cena and Punk had a match to determine the number one contender in which Cena came out victorious. Cena defeated Rock to capture the WWE Championship at WrestleMania 29.

After failing his chances of winning back the WWE Championship, CM Punk set his sights on The Undertaker with the sole intention at wanting to end his undefeated WrestleMania Streak. Punk defeated Randy Orton, Big Show and Sheamus on the Old School Raw special on March 4 to earn his right to face The Undertaker at WrestleMania 29, however, he failed to end The Streak at the event after Undertaker defeated him to extend his undefeated Streak to 21-0. Punk would later become the final victim of The Streak as it would end after Undertaker was defeated by Brock Lesnar at WrestleMania XXX.

At WrestleMania 29, Alberto Del Rio defeated Jack Swagger to retain the World Heavyweight Championship. The next day on Raw, Dolph Ziggler cashed in his Money In the Bank briefcase on an injured Del Rio, and defeated Del Rio to capture the World Heavyweight Championship.

On the March 8 edition of SmackDown, Layla began turning heel when she cost Kaitlyn a non-title match against Tamina. The angle was rumored to lead to Kaitlyn defending the Divas Championship against the evil Layla at WrestleMania 29, but it was dropped a week later.

The following night on Raw, The Miz defeated Antonio Cesaro in a non-title No Disqualification match via submission to earn another shot at the United States Championship. The title rematch took place the following week on SmackDown in a Two-out-of-Three Falls match, where Miz failed again to capture the title from Cesaro.

Results

Elimination Chamber entrances and eliminations

References

External links

Official Elimination Chamber website
Elimination Chamber Matches

2013
Professional wrestling in New Orleans
Events in New Orleans
2013 in Louisiana
2013 WWE pay-per-view events
February 2013 events in the United States